Gösta Grip (14 June 1904 – 26 March 1998) was a Swedish actor.

Grip made his film debut in Gustav Edgren's Simon i Backabo in 1934, and came to participate in 30 film productions.

Selected filmography 

 Under False Flag (1935)
 John Ericsson, Victor of Hampton Roads (1937)
 Only One Night (1939)
 Bashful Anton (1940)
 Frestelse (1940)
 Kiss Her! (1940)
 Lasse-Maja (1941)
 Doctor Glas (1942)
 Dangerous Ways (1942)
 It Is My Music (1942)

External links 
 https://www.imdb.com/name/nm0342497/
 https://www.dramaten.se/Medverkande/Rollboken/Person/2930/
 https://www.kinopoisk.ru/name/216818/

References 

Swedish actors
1904 births
1998 deaths
Swedish male film actors
20th-century Swedish male actors
Male actors from Stockholm